Cambia can mean:
 Cambia, Haute-Corse, a commune in the Haute-Corse department of France
 Cambia (non-profit organization), an open science and biology non-profit institute based in Australia
 Cambia Health Solutions, an American health insurance company
 Cambia or cambiums, the four humours in medicine
 Cambia, a trade name for the anti-inflammatory drug diclofenac
 the plural of cambium (botany), a type of tissue found in plants

See also
 Cambio (disambiguation)
 Cambria (disambiguation)
 Kambia (disambiguation)
 Cumbia, a style of music and dance
 Cumbria, a county of England